Jessie Macgregor (1847–1919) was a British painter.

Macgregor first learned drawing at the drawing academy in Liverpool run by her grandfather Andrew Hunt. Her parents went to live in London and she began to study painting there, becoming a pupil at the Schools of the Royal Academy where her teachers were Lord Leighton, P. H. Calderon, R.A., and John Pettie, R.A.

She won a gold medal at the Royal Academy for history painting in 1871. She was the second woman after Louisa Starr's gold medal in 1867, and the last woman to do so until 1909. She beat Julia Cecilia Smith and Julia Bracewell Folkard. It was noted how these three women's achievements revealed the silliness of the rules that excluded women from becoming full members of the Royal Academy.

Macgregor exhibited her work at the Palace of Fine Arts at the 1893 World's Columbian Exposition in Chicago, Illinois.

Her painting In the Reign of Terror was included in the 1905 book Women Painters of the World.

References

External links

 
Jessie Macgregor auction results at Artnet
 

1847 births
1919 deaths
Artists from Liverpool
19th-century English painters
19th-century English women artists
20th-century English painters
20th-century English women artists
Alumni of the Royal Academy Schools
English women painters